The human ATG4D gene encodes the protein Autophagy related 4D, cysteine peptidase.

Function 

Autophagy is the process by which endogenous proteins and damaged organelles are destroyed intracellularly. Autophagy is postulated to be essential for cell homeostasis and cell remodeling during differentiation, metamorphosis, non-apoptotic cell death, and aging. Reduced levels of autophagy have been described in some malignant tumors, and a role for autophagy in controlling the unregulated cell growth linked to cancer has been proposed. 

This gene belongs to the autophagy-related protein 4 (Atg4) family of C54 endopeptidases. Members of this family encode proteins that play a role in the biogenesis of autophagosomes, which sequester the cytosol and organelles for degradation by lysosomes. Alternative splicing results in multiple transcript variants. [provided by RefSeq, Jul 2013].

References

Further reading 

 
 
 

Human proteins